Defective democracies is a concept that was proposed by the political scientists Wolfgang Merkel, Hans-Jürgen Puhle and Aurel S. Croissant at the beginning of the 21st century to subtilize the distinctions between totalitarian, authoritarian, and democratic political systems. It is based on the concept of embedded democracy. There are four forms of defective democracy, how each nation reaches the point of defectiveness varies. One recurring theme is the geographical location of the nation, which includes the effects of the influence of surrounding nations in the region. Other causes for defective democracies include their path of modernization, level of modernization, economic trends, social capital, civil society, political institutions, and education.

Aspects of healthy democracies 

To understand what makes a democracy defective, one must establish what a healthy democratic form of government is. A democracy is a system of government in which private citizens exercise their power directly by electing officials to one or more governing bodies, such as Norway's Storting. Healthy democracies can be classified as defective when any of the key components of government are missing, or fail to properly link to one another. All democracies provide universal suffrage, free and fair elections occurring on a recurring basis, a multi-party system, multiple sources of information in the country, universal rights, and voters' decision-making unhindered by country elites or external actors.

Types of defective democracies

Exclusive democracy 

Exclusive democracies are defective democracies because not all adult citizens have suffrage, resulting in unfair elections with no true sovereignty of the people. A major step forward in American democracy occurred with the passing of the Nineteenth Amendment to the United States Constitution, which was brought forward due to the women's suffrage movement and ensured all US citizens have the right to vote, regardless of sex. The passing of the amendment ensured the US would not remain an exclusive democracy.

Domain democracy 
 
When militaries, entrepreneurs, landlords, local militias, or multi-national corporations take up political domains and veto power from the hands of democratically elected officials, the result is a domain democracy. An example of a military coup resulting in a domain democracy is the 2017 Zimbabwean coup d'état, in which the Zimbabwean military seized control of the Zimbabwe Broadcasting Corporation, key areas of Harare city, and placed Zimbabwean President Robert Mugabe under house arrest. In this instance, the coup was successful and after the resignation of Mugabe, Emmerson Mnangagwa peacefully became the 3rd President of Zimbabwe.

Illiberal democracy 

When elected officials are no longer held to constitutional principles due to the deterioration of power held by the judiciary, the nation becomes an illiberal democracy in which the rule of law is damaged or flawed, and the constitutional norms have little or no binding impact on elected officials and their actions. Individual civil rights are either partially nullified or not established. Illiberal democracy is the most common form of defective democracy.

In 2017, Venezuela held a controversial election for state governors. Venezuela's President Nicolás Maduro and his United Socialist Party swept the election, winning 17 of 23 states and 54% of the popular vote, despite Maduro's approval rating fluctuating between 17% and 22%. Ruling party members used state resources to help their campaigns, giving them an advantage over their rivals. The use of state funds for campaigns is illegal under normal circumstances but the Venezuelan court system had deteriorated to the point at which it only acted to serve the ruling party instead of serving true justice. This and other factors makes Venezuela a defective democracy.

Delegative democracy 

In delegative democracies, the Executive branch reigns supreme and the legislature and judiciary have very limited power over the Executive. Constitutional norms are rarely followed and the checks and balances of power required in healthy democracies are undermined.

Delegative democracies commonly happen when there is one ruling party in a nation. Mexico prior to 1997 is an example. Mexico's ruling party, the Institutional Revolutionary Party, ruled unchecked by any viable competition since the Mexican Revolution. During the PRI's political dominance in Mexico, the nation was a delegative democracy with the executive branch ruling supreme and the Congress effectively rubber-stamping decisions.

Anocratic regimes

Anocractic regimes are dictatorships with a democratic institution of the legislature. They possess a mixture of both democratic and autocratic attributes, which can lead to an increase in conflict within the nation. These types of governments can exist when the ruling elite avoid severe rights abuses and do not steal or cancel elections. The ruling party ensures the rights abuses are not well-publicized, which would agitate the people they are ruling over.

Cuba for example, is an anocratic regime with both autocratic and democratic attributes. In Cuba, the Communist Party has complete control over the nation but there are still democratic attributes, namely the National Assembly of Popular Power, whose 600 members are elected for five-year terms by popular vote. None of the elections for Assembly positions, however, are contested.

See also 

 Semi-democracy
Hybrid regime

References

Literature

External links 
Wolfgang Merkel, Defective Democracies, 1999
Wolfgang Merkel, Embedded and Defective Democracies, 2004
Hans-Jürgen Puhle, Democratic Consolidation and 'Defective Democracies', 2005

Democracy
Functionalism (social theory)